Beaver Creek is a stream in Alberta, Canada. It is a tributary of the Oldman River.

Beaver Creek's name comes from the Blackfoot Indians of the area, who saw beavers near its course.

See also
List of rivers of Alberta

References

Rivers of Alberta